Garland at the Grove is a 1959 live album by American vocalist Judy Garland accompanied by Freddy Martin and his Orchestra. The album was recorded at the Cocoanut Grove nightclub at the Ambassador Hotel in Los Angeles.

Reception
Garland at the Grove preceded Garland's famous run and landmark recording at Carnegie Hall by three years. The Cocoanut Grove show featured Garland with Freddy Martin's Orchestra, rather than others like Nelson Riddle or Billy May.

William Ruhlmann of Allmusic awarded the album four stars, writing: "from the spring of 1951 on, Judy Garland's reputation rested on her abilities as a live act, but it took another eight years before her first commercially recorded live album was issued by Capitol Records (ST 1118)... The audience is enthusiastic, especially toward the end, when, coming out for her encores, Garland asks for requests and gets plenty. Even without the visual complement (and said to be suffering from laryngitis, which is only occasionally evident), she is clearly a powerful performer with a strong connection to her listeners."

Track listing
 Garland Overture: "The Trolley Song"/"Over the Rainbow"/"The Man That Got Away" (Ralph Blane, Hugh Martin)/(Harold Arlen, Yip Harburg)/(Arlen, Ira Gershwin) – 3:39
"When You're Smiling (The Whole World Smiles with You)" (Mark Fisher, Joe Goodwin, Larry Shay) – 3:19
"Day In, Day Out" (Rube Bloom, Johnny Mercer) – 3:11
"I Can't Give You Anything But Love" (Dorothy Fields, Jimmy McHugh) – 5:02
 "Zing! Went the Strings of My Heart" (James F. Hanley) – 4:10
 "Purple People Eater" (Sheb Wooley) – 3:39
 Medley: "You Made Me Love You"/"For Me and My Gal"/"The Trolley Song" (Joseph McCarthy, James V. Monaco, Roger Edens)/(George W. Meyer, Edgar Leslie, E. Ray Goetz) – 5:21
"Do It Again" (George Gershwin, Buddy DeSylva) – 3:47
"When the Sun Comes Out" (Harold Arlen, Ted Koehler) – 3:11
"Rock-A-Bye Your Baby with a Dixie Melody" (Sam M. Lewis, Fred Schwartz, Joe Young) – 2:51
 "Over the Rainbow" (Arlen, Yip Harburg) – 5:01
 "After You've Gone" (Henry Creamer, Turner Layton) – 2:31
 "A Pretty Girl Milking Her Cow" (Roger Edens, Traditional) – 2:41
 "Swanee" (Irving Caesar, G. Gershwin) – 2:49

Personnel
Judy Garland – vocals
Freddy Martin and his Orchestra
Freddy Martin – arranger, conductor

References

Capitol Records live albums
Judy Garland live albums
1959 live albums
Albums conducted by Freddy Martin
Albums arranged by Freddy Martin